Jean Froissard is a French writer and a leading authority on the subject of horsemanship. He has written a number of reference works on the subject, some of them co-written with his wife Lily Powell who is also an award-winning novelist in her own right. Froissard has been conferred the highest degree of Ecuyer Professeur by the French Equestrian Federation. He lives with his wife in Paris, France.

Selected works
 Classical Horsemanship for Our Time (with Lily Powell)
 A Guide to Basic Dressage 
 The above two books have also been published as one volume entitled The Education of Horse and Rider.
 Equitation: Learning and Teaching
 Jumping: Learning and Teaching
 The Horseman's International Book of Reference (co-editor with Lily Powell)

References

Living people
Writers on horsemanship
French male non-fiction writers
Dressage trainers
Show jumping trainers
Year of birth missing (living people)